Tani District is situated in the southern part of Khost Province, Afghanistan. It borders Spera District to the west, Nadir Shah Kot and Mando Zayi to the north, Gurbuz District to the east and Pakistan to the south. The population is 52,800 (2006) people. The district center is the village of Tani, situated in the northeastern part of the district. Tanokhel tribe is settled here. The language spoken in Tani is Pashto.

External links

AIMS District Map

Districts of Khost Province